Margaret C. Johnson is a Canadian Progressive Conservative politician who has represented Carleton-Victoria in the Legislative Assembly of New Brunswick since 2020.

Political career 
Johnson defeated incumbent Liberal MLA Andrew Harvey in 2020. Johnson had previously lost to Harvey in the 2018 provincial election.

Johnson is a member of the Executive Council of New Brunswick.

Electoral history

References 

Living people
Progressive Conservative Party of New Brunswick MLAs
Women MLAs in New Brunswick
21st-century Canadian politicians
21st-century Canadian women politicians
People from Carleton County, New Brunswick
Members of the Executive Council of New Brunswick
Year of birth missing (living people)
Women government ministers of Canada